The Baptistery of San Giovanni ad Fontes is a religious edifice in Lomello, Lombardy, northern Italy. An example of Romanesque-Lombard architecture, it is annexed to the basilica of Santa Maria Maggiore, another early Middle Ages structure.

Description
The baptistery has a typical cross plan, but in the interior the central part forms an octagon, over which is a dome of the same shape. The interior is wholly plastered, and can be accessed from two portals. The baptistery has, on the east-west axis, an overall length of 16 m.

The main element is the baptismal font, dating to the 7th-8th centuries.

The baptistery has an elevation of 13 m and is entirely built of brickworks, parts of which date to the 5th-6th centuries. The dome is a later addition (c. 10th century), and was built using  less precious materials.

References

Churches in the province of Pavia
Religious buildings and structures in Lombardy
Lombard architecture
Giovanni Fontes
Tourist attractions in Lombardy
Romanesque architecture in Lombardy
Baptisteries in Italy